Osatu (Ihatum) is a Grassfields language of Cameroon.

Osatu is poorly documented and for a time had been considered a Tivoid language.

References

Southwest Grassfields languages
Languages of Cameroon